Sedelnikovo is a rural locality (a village) in Oktyabrskoye Rural Settlement, Vyaznikovsky District, Vladimir Oblast, Russia. The population was 13 as of 2010.

Geography 
Sedelnikovo is located 17 km south of Vyazniki (the district's administrative centre) by road. Naguyevo is the nearest rural locality.

References 

Rural localities in Vyaznikovsky District